The 1991 European Open Water Swimming Championships was the second edition of the European Open Water Swimming Championships and took part from 14 to 15 September 1991 in Terracina, Italy.

Results

Men

Women

Medal table

See also
 List of medalists at the European Open Water Swimming Championships

References

External links
 Ligue Européenne de Natation LEN Official Website

European Open Water Swimming Championships
European Open Water Championships